The 1996 Nicholls State Colonels football team represented Nicholls State University as a member of the Southland Football League during the 1996 NCAA Division I-AA football season. Led by second-year head coach Darren Barbier, the Colonels compiled an overall record of 8–4 with mark of 4–2 in conference play, placing second in the Southland. Nicholls State advanced to the NCAA Division I-AA Football Championship playoffs, losing in the first round to eventual national runner-up, Montana. The team played home games at John L. Guidry Stadium in Thibodaux, Louisiana.

Schedule

References

Nicholls State
Nicholls Colonels football seasons
Nicholls State Colonels football